Dominique Hourani (born 7 August 1985) is a Lebanese recording artist, actress, beauty queen, and former model.

Personal life
In 2007, Hourani married her second husband, an Iranian-Dutch businessman named Alireza Almass Nokiani. Together they have a daughter, Delara Sue Almassi (born in 2009). The couple have been officially separated since 2012. She currently lives in the UAE.

Modeling
She won a competition with contestants from over 80 countries and was awarded the Miss Intercontinental 2003 title.

Acting
Hourani first appeared on the television series, Oyoun Kha'ena (The eyes of the deceiver), alongside famous TV presenter, Tony Khalife. The series was broadcast in Lebanon and the Arab world on LBC.

In 2009, Hourani decided to go with her first movie El Beeh Romancy, along with Mohamed Adel Emam, Hasan Housni, Lebleba, Mena Arafa and Saad El Soghaier.

Singing

Hourani traveled to America and sang at an Arab American festival concert with more than 300,000 people attending.

Discography

Albums
Etriss (2006)
Kermalik Ya Dominique (2008)
Dominique 2011 (2011)

References

External links
 
Ethnocloud profile

1985 births
Living people
Musicians from Beirut
Lebanese female models
21st-century Lebanese women singers
Lebanese beauty pageant winners
Lebanese socialites
Lebanese American University alumni